Popowo  is a village in north-central Poland, in the administrative district of Gmina Lipno, within Lipno County, Kuyavian-Pomeranian Voivodeship.

References

Popowo